András Kaj (born 21 December 1977) is a Hungarian football player who currently plays for Kávás KSE.

Professional career
Kaj has made over 100 appearances in the Hungarian First Division. He began his playing career in the lower division of Hungarian football, and after a brief spell in Austria, he made his Hungarian First Division debut at the age of 22 playing for Szombathelyi Haladás in a match against Kispest Honvéd on 6 August 1999.

Kaj would spend the next five seasons with Haladás until the club went bankrupt. Subsequently, he moved to Zalaegerszegi TE, but after two seasons, he would return to Haladás to help the club back into the top flight by winning the 2007–08 Hungarian Second Division championship.

Honours  
Hungarian Second Division:  Winner: 2008

References

External links

 EUFO

1977 births
Living people
Hungarian footballers
Hungarian expatriate footballers
Zalaegerszegi TE players
FC Ajka players
Szombathelyi Haladás footballers
Hungarian expatriate sportspeople in Austria
Expatriate footballers in Austria
Association football midfielders